Isomäki (in Swedish: Storbacken) is one of the districts of Pori. The area is meant for sports activities and there are no residential buildings. The area borders Highway 2 to the north and Highway 8 to the west. To the south is the Pori forest, which is thought of as a part of the Isomäki sports centre.

Pori sports centre 
Isomäki is home to Porin Ässät's home arena, the Isomäki Areena (also known as West Areena and Porin jäähalli). Pori Stadium is also located in Isomäki. Isomäki also has an outdoors ice rink. Next to the ice rink is Karhuhalli, used by footballers and other athletes.

Isomäki areena 

Isomäki Areena (also known as West Areena and Porin jäähalli) is an arena mainly used for ice hockey. It is mainly used by Porin Ässät and Karhu HT.

References 

Pori